Stellar Supreme is a music album by techno/trance artist Cosmic Baby. It is Cosmic Baby's debut album and it was first released in late 1992 on the MFS label.

Track listing

Trivia 
 The track "Stimme der Energie" features a sample of the track of the same name by Kraftwerk from the album Radio-Aktivität (Radio-Activity) from 1975.

References

External links 
 Stellar Supreme in unofficial discography
 Cosmic Baby homepage

1992 debut albums
Cosmic Baby albums